Fan mail is mail sent by fans to popular figures.

Fan mail may also refer to:

Music
FanMail, TLC album
"Fanmail", TLC song
Fan Mail (The Dickies song), Phillips, Huffsteter, Kaballero, 1980 chart single from album Dawn of the Dickies
"Fan Mail", song by Blondie, written by Jimmy Destri, from Plastic Letters, B-side to I'm Gonna Love You Too   1978
"Fan Mail", song by Christian rapper KJ-52 2009